Evon is a given name. Notable people with the name include:
 Evon Clarke (born 1965), Jamaican sprinter
 Evon McInnis (born 1980), Jamaican cricketer
 Evon Z. Vogt (1918-2004), American
 Evon Daniel Williams (1896 – 1929), American professional baseball player; see Denny Williams
Evon Geffries & The Stand; see The Family Stand

See also
Evon Zartman Vogt Ranch House, a historic house in New Mexico, U.S.
Evin (disambiguation)
Evan
Even (disambiguation)
Yvon (disambiguation)
Yvonne (disambiguation)
Ivon
Evonne

Masculine given names